Microlestes aenigmaticus is a species of ground beetle in the family Carabidae.

Subspecies
These two subspecies belong to the species Microlestes aenigmaticus:
 Microlestes aenigmaticus aenigmaticus Mateu, 1963
 Microlestes aenigmaticus globulosus Mateu, 1963

References

Carabidae
Articles created by Qbugbot
Beetles described in 1963